Charles Louis Baptiste Lebreton (born 15 December 1800) was a French politician born in Ploërmel (Morbihan). His date of death is unknown.

Marine surgeon in 1824, he became a medical doctor in 1834 and set up shop in Pleyben. In 1848, he was elected as the representative from Finistère to the Constituent assembly.  After not being re-elected in 1849, he found a seat as a deputy in the complementary elections held on 2 July 1871, registered as a member of the Gauche républicaine. He was also General Counsel for the canton of Pleyben in 1871. He left political life in 1876.

References

Members of the 1848 Constituent Assembly
Members of the National Assembly (1871)